Carlos Rubén Rivera Moulton (born 30 May 1979) is a retired Panamanian football defender.

Club career
Rivera played for several Panamanian clubs but also had spells abroad with Colombian club Independiente Medellín and Iranian side Persepolis, whom he joined in 2005 alongside compatriot José Anthony Torres.

In January 2011 Rivera moved to Sporting San Miguelito. In December 2012, he won the 2012 Apertura championship of the Panamanian second division with Millenium UP but he missed out on promotion after losing the Super Final to 2013 Clausura winners Independiente.

International career
Rivera made his debut for Panama in a March 2004 friendly match against Cuba and has earned a total of 63 caps, scoring 2 goals. He represented his country in 15 FIFA World Cup qualification matches and was a member of the 2005 CONCACAF Gold Cup team, who finished second in the tournament and he also played at the 2007 and 2009 CONCACAF Gold Cups. During the 2007 CONCACAF Gold Cup Group C opener against Honduras, Rivera scored his first ever international goal for Panama.

His final international was a November 2010 friendly match against Honduras.

International goals
Scores and results list Panama's goal tally first.

Managerial career
After retiring, he became assistant coach at Millenium UP in September 2014.

References

External links

1979 births
Living people
Sportspeople from Panama City
Association football defenders
Panamanian footballers
Panama international footballers
2005 CONCACAF Gold Cup players
2007 UNCAF Nations Cup players
2007 CONCACAF Gold Cup players
2009 UNCAF Nations Cup players
2009 CONCACAF Gold Cup players
Copa Centroamericana-winning players
Categoría Primera A players
C.D. Árabe Unido players
San Francisco F.C. players
Independiente Medellín footballers
Persepolis F.C. players
Tauro F.C. players
Sporting San Miguelito players
Panamanian expatriate footballers
Expatriate footballers in Colombia
Expatriate footballers in Iran
Panamanian expatriate sportspeople in Colombia